This is a list of Michelin starred restaurants in Shanghai, China. The 2017 edition was the first edition of the Michelin Guide to Shanghai to be published.

List of restaurants

2021 - 2030

2017 - 2020

References

External links
 Shanghai Michelin Restaurants - the Michelin Guide - ViaMichelin

Michelin starred restaurants in Shanghai
Michelin Guide starred restaurants in China
Restaurants in Shanghai